John Ewerekumoh Yeri was a Nigerian soldier who served as Governor of Bendel State between 1990 and 1991, and then continued as governor of Edo State until January 1992 after Bendel State was split into Edo State and Delta State.
He was military governor during the administration of General Ibrahim Babangida, and handed over to an elected civilian governor in January 1992.

In a speech in December 1991, he said that the Military Administration held traditional rulers in high esteem, and expected them to enlighten their subjects about Government policies and programs at the grass root level.
During his tenure, the administration made some investment in improving the roads of the state.

References

Nigerian military personnel
Living people
Governors of Edo State
Year of birth missing (living people)